Crenicichla mucuryna is a species of cichlid native to South America. It is found in the Mucuri River basin in eastern Brazil.

References

Kullander, S.O., 2003. Cichlidae (Cichlids). p. 605-654. In R.E. Reis, S.O. Kullander and C.J. Ferraris, Jr. (eds.) Checklist of the Freshwater Fishes of South and Central America. Porto Alegre: EDIPUCRS, Brasil.

mucuryna
Fish of the Mucuri River basin
Taxa named by Rodolpho von Ihering
Fish described in 1991